In mathematics, an element  of a Banach algebra  is called a topological divisor of zero if there exists a sequence  of elements of  such that
 The sequence  converges to the zero element, but
 The sequence  does not converge to the zero element.
If such a sequence exists, then one may assume that  for all .

If  is not commutative, then  is called a "left" topological divisor of zero, and one may define "right" topological divisors of zero similarly.

Examples
Any point on the boundary between these two sets is both a left and right topological divisor of zero.
 In particular, any quasinilpotent element is a topological divisor of zero (e.g. the Volterra operator).

Generalization
The notion of a topological divisor of zero may be generalized to any topological algebra.  If the algebra in question is not first-countable, one must substitute nets for the sequences used in the definition.

Topological algebra